The 8th annual Billboard Latin Music Awards which honor the most popular albums, songs, and performers in Latin music took place in Miami.

Pop Album of the Year, Male
Luis Miguel — Vivo
 Chayanne — Simplemente
 Oscar De La Hoya — Oscar De La Hoya
 Alejandro Fernández — Entre tus brazos

Pop album of the year, female
Mi Reflejo, Christina Aguilera
Paulina, Paulina Rubio
MTV Unplugged, Shakira
Arrasando, Thalía

Pop album of the year, group
Mi Gloria, Eres Tu, Los Tri-OEl Sapo Azul, Azul
Subir Al Cielo, MDO
CD 00, OV7

Pop album of the year, new artistMi Reflejo, Christina AguileraEl Sapo Azul, Azul
Oscar De La Hoya, Oscar De La Hoya
CD 00, OV7

Latin Pop Track of the YearA Puro Dolor — "Son by Four" Muy Dentro de Mi, Marc Anthony
 Por Amarte Así — Cristian Castro
 Atado a Tu Amor — "Chayanne"

Tropical/salsa album of the year, maleEl Amor de Mi Tierra, Carlos VivesWow! Flash, Elvis Crespo
Chanchullo, Rubén González
Obra maestra, Tito Puente & Eddie Palmieri

Tropical/salsa album of the year, femaleAlma Caribeña, Gloria EstefanVoy a Enamorarte, Gisselle
Baño de Luna, Melina León
Buena Vista Social Club Presents Omara Portuondo, Omara Portuondo

Tropical/salsa album of the year, groupSon by Four, Son by FourDistinto, Diferente, Afro-Cuban All Stars (Universal Latino)
Masters of the Stage, Grupo Manía
Sabe a Limi-T, Limi-T 21

Tropical/salsa album of the year, new artistSon by Four, Son by FourSeras Parte De Mi Mundo, Anthony
Con Su Loquera, Mala Fe
Buena Vista Social Club Presents Omara Portuondo, Omara Portuondo

Tropical/salsa track of the yearA Puro Dolor — "Son by Four" Muy Dentro de Mi, Marc Anthony
"Jurame", Gisselle
"Que Alguien Me Diga", "Gilberto Santa Rosa"

Regional Mexican album of the year, male"Secreto De Amor", Joan Sebastian"Lo Grande De Los Grandes", Pepe Aguilar
"Por Una Mujer Bonita", Pepe Aguilar
"Lobo Herido", Vicente Fernández

Regional Mexican album of the year, male groupEn la Madrugada Se Fue, Los TemerariosLo Mejor de Mi Vida, Banda el Recodo
Morir de Amor, Conjunto Primavera
De Paisano A Paisano, Los Tigres del Norte

Regional Mexican album of the year, female group or female solo artistPor Encima De Todo , Grupo LímitePrenda Del Alma, Yesenia Flores
Abrázame y Bésame, Jennifer
El Amor Nos Mantendra Juntos, Priscila y Sus Balas de Plata

Regional Mexican album of the year, new artistAbrázame y Bésame, Jennifer100 Años de Mariachi, Placido Domingo

Regional Mexican track of the year"El Liston De Tu Pelo", Los Ángeles Azules"Yo Se Que Te Acordarass", Banda el Recodo
"Morir de Amor", Conjunto Primavera
"Y Sigues Siendo tu", Rogelio Martínez

Latin rock album of the yearMTV Unplugged, ShakiraBrujerizmo, Brujeria
Uno, La Ley

Hot Latin Track of the Year
 "A Puro Dolor", Son by Four""Muy Dentro de Mi", Marc Anthony
"Que Alguien Me Diga", "Gilberto Santa Rosa"
"Secreto De Amor", Joan Sebastian

Hot Latin Tracks of the Year, Vocal Duo"Que Locura Enamorarme de Ti", Eddie Santiago and Huey Dunbar "Come Baby Come", Gizelle D'Cole and Elvis Crespo
 "Pideme", Milly Quezada and Fernando Villalona

Latin jazz album of the yearLatin Soul, Poncho Sanchez¡Muy Divertido!, Marc Ribot y Los Cubanos
Soul of the Conga, Poncho Sanchez
Live at the Village Vanguard, Chucho Valdés

Latin greatest-hits album of the yearDesde un Principio: From the Beginning, Marc AnthonyThe Remixes, Elvis Crespo
The Best Hits, Enrique Iglesias
All My Hits Vol. 2, Selena

Latin compilation album of the year2000 Latin Grammy Nominees'', Various ArtistBillboard Latin Music Awards, Various ArtistGuerra de Estados Pesados, Various ArtistMerenhits 2000'', Various Artist

Latin Dance Maxi-Single of the Year
"Sólo me importas tú", Enrique Iglesias
 "Muy Dentro de Mi", Marc Anthony
 "No Me Dejes de Querer", Gloria Estefan
 "Shake Your Bon-Bon", Ricky Martin

Latin Dance Club Play Track of the Year
"Sólo me importas tú", Enrique Iglesias
 "No Me Dejes de Querer", Gloria Estefan
 "Cada Vez", Negrocan
 "Asi", Jon Secada

The Billboard Latin 50 Artists of the year
Son by Four
Christina Aguilera
Marc Anthony
Shakira

Hot Latin Tracks Artist of the Year
Son by Four
Marc Anthony
Cristian Castro
Conjunto Primavera

Songwriter of the Year
Omar Alfanno
 Estéfano
 Rudy Pérez
 Kike Santander

Producer of the Year
Rudy Pérez
 Emilio Estefan
 Alejandro Jaén
 Kike Santander

Publisher of the year
EMOA-ASCAP
F.I.P.P, BMI
Sony/ATV Latin, BMI
WB, ASCAP

Publishing corporation of the year
Sony/ATV Music
EMI Music
F.I.P.P.
Universal Music

Spirit of Hope
Los Tigres del Norte

Billboard Latin Music Hall of Fame
Mongo Santamaría

Billboard Lifetime achievement award
Los Lobos

Star award
Thalía

References

Billboard Latin Music Awards
Latin Billboard Music Awards
Latin Billboard Music Awards
Billboard Music Awards
Latin Billboard Music